A Dreikanter is a type of ventifact that typically forms in desert or periglacial environments due to the abrasive action of blowing sand.

Dreikanters exhibit a characteristic pyramidal shape with three wind-abraded facets. The word Dreikanter is German for "three-edged." 

Similarly, a zweikanter ("two-edged") has two wind facets, an einkanter ("one-edged"), has only one wind facet. 

Most places on the planet have several weathering processes acting at the same time, so finding good examples of Dreikanters is often difficult. Antarctica is a good location for finding such ventifacts since wind is usually the only active weathering agent. Many specimens in the Northeastern United States were formed during the Pleistocene era when the absence of vegetation made for little cover from wind-blown sediment.

Common features
Some common features of Dreikanters include fluting, high polish, sharp ridges, pits, grooves, and helical forms.

Formation
In areas where there is a prevailing wind, sand and debris cause a rock face to become flattened and polished. This changes the mass distribution of the rock, and may cause it to turn another surface toward the wind. If this process continues undisturbed, the resulting rock will have three distinct flattened and polished faces. Dreikanters generally form in dry, arid environments from hard rocks.

See also

References

External links
 An image of a Dreikanter
Glossary of Meteorology

Geomorphology
Petrology